Werner Schott (20 November 1891, in Berlin – 6 September 1965) was a German actor.

Selected filmography

 Gefesselt (1920) - Allan
 Das vierte Gebot (1920) - Weltpriester Eduard
 Wie Satan starb (1920)
 Golgatha (1920) - Josef
 Der verlorene Schatten (1921) - Graf Durande
 Die Schauspielerin des Kaisers (1921)
 The Daughter of the Brigadier (1922)
 König einer Nacht (1922)
 Genoveva (1922)
 Die Sportlady (1922)
 Tragedy in the House of Habsburg (1924) - Corradini
 Der Sturz ins Glück (1924)
 Das Gift der Borgia (1924)
 Luther (1928) - Johann der Beständige
 The Last Company (1930) - Biese
 The Flute Concert of Sanssouci (1930) - Frazösischer Gesandter in Dresden
 Danton (1931) - St. Just
 F.P.1 antwortet nicht (1932) - Matthias Lennartz
 Ich will Dich Liebe lehren (1933) - Der Frieseur
 William Tell (1934) - Vogt Landenberg
 The Big Chance (1934) - Hans Raschdorf, Chefingenieur
 The Four Musketeers (1934) - Hauptmann der Kompanie
 Ein Mann will nach Deutschland (1934)
 The Sporck Battalion (1934) - Hauptmann Rabenhainer
 Herr Kobin geht auf Abenteuer (1934) - Baron von Dingenberg
 Oberwachtmeister Schwenke (1935)
 The Old and the Young King (1935)
 Anschlag auf Schweda (1935) - Der Zuchthausdirektor
 Henker, Frauen und Soldaten (1935)
 Ride to Freedom (1937) - Bobrikoff
 Liebe geht seltsame Wege (1937) - Der General
 Pan (1937) - Der Doktor
 Rätsel um Beate (1938) - Direktor Koch
 Narren im Schnee (1938) - Der Sonderbare
 You and I (1938) - Schütz
 Napoleon Is to Blame for Everything (1938) - Teilnehmer am Napoleon Kongress (uncredited)
 Dance on the Volcano (1938) - Soldat (uncredited)
 Women for Golden Hill (1938) - Flughafenkommandant
 A Prussian Love Story (1938) - Generaladjutant von Witzleben
 War es der im 3. Stock? (1938) - Professor Dachs, Chefarzt
 Bachelor's Paradise (1939) - Kapitän
 Escape in the Dark (1939)
 Robert Koch (1939) - Arzt
 Die goldene Maske (1939) - Professor Torner
 Kennwort Machin (1939)
 Alarm at Station III (1939) - Polizeipräsident
 A Man Astray (1940) - Carlsson, Patterssons Sekretär
 Wunschkonzert (1940)
 Der Sündenbock (1940)
 Krach im Vorderhaus (1941) - (uncredited)
 The Great King (1942) - (uncredited)
 Melody of a Great City (1943) - Herr Petersen
 Herr Sanders lebt gefährlich (1944) - Franck, Kriminalkommissar
 Der große Preis (1944) - Staatsanwalt
 The Roedern Affair (1944) - Oberst von Sack
 Five Suspects (1950) - Kriminalkommissar Ribe (uncredited)
 The Woman from Last Night (1950)
 Not Without Gisela (1951) - Chefredakteur
 The Seven Dresses of Katrin (1954) - Polizeikommissar
 Love (1956)
 Der Würger von Schloß Blackmoor (1963)

External links

1891 births
1965 deaths
German male film actors
German male silent film actors
Male actors from Berlin
20th-century German male actors